Kolathur State Assembly constituency is one of the 234 state legislative assembly constituencies in Tamil Nadu in southern India. Its State Assembly Constituency number is 13. It is also one of the 6 state legislative assembly constituencies included in the Chennai North Lok Sabha constituency. This constituency was represented only by the chief minister of Tamil Nadu M. K. Stalin.

List of members of legislative assembly

Election results

2021

2016

2011

References 

Assembly constituencies of Tamil Nadu